Anthem of a Teenage Prophet is a 2018 Canadian drama film directed by Robin Hays and starring Cameron Monaghan, Peyton List and Juliette Lewis.  It is based on Joanne Proulx's young adult novel of the same name. It is also Hays' feature directorial debut. The film premiered at the 2018 Vancouver International Film Festival.

Cast
Cameron Monaghan as Luke Hunter
Grayson Gabriel as Fang
Peyton List as Faith
Juliette Lewis as Mary
Alex MacNicoll as Stan

Release
The film was released theatrically on January 11, 2019.

Reception
Frank Scheck of The Hollywood Reporter gave the film a negative review and wrote, "Such restraint is admirable in a genre not known for it, but it results in the film feeling more tepid than it should have been."

References

External links
 
 

2018 films
2018 drama films
Canadian drama films
English-language Canadian films
2010s English-language films
Films based on Canadian novels
2010s Canadian films